The 1915 University Farm football team represented the University Farm—now known as the University of California, Davis—as an independent during the 1915 college football season. Although "University Farm" was the formal name for the school and team, in many newspaper articles from the time it was called "Davis Farm". The team had no nickname in 1915, with the "Aggie" term being introduced in 1922. Led by Robert E. Harmon in his first and only season as head coach, the team compiled a record of 3–2 and was outscored its opponents 54 to 51 for the season. The University Farm played home games in Davis, California.

1915 was the first year that University Farm competed in intercollegiate football.

Schedule

References

University Farm
UC Davis Aggies football seasons
University Farm football